Kamaraj Rural District is a rural district (dehestan) in Kamaraj and Konartakhteh District, Kazerun County, Fars Province, Iran. At the 2006 census, its population was 4,528, in 946 families.  The rural district has 15 villages.

References 

Rural Districts of Fars Province
Kazerun County